Obložené chlebíčky ("garnished breads") are a type of open sandwich in Czech and Slovak cuisines. Various toppings and garnishes are used, and they are often served as an appetizer dish or as a snack.

Overview
Obložené chlebíčky consist of sliced bread that has butter or another kind of spread on it, atop which a variety of toppings may be added. Toppings used on obložené chlebíčky include various cured meats such as ham, salami and sausage, sliced hard-boiled egg, cheeses, cream cheese, cucumber, tomato, fish paste, salads and various spreads prepared with meat, vegetables or cheeses. Some vegetables such as bell pepper, pickle, tomato, radish and parsley may be used as a garnish. Veka or baguette bread may be used in their preparation. They are sometimes sold as a snack food at food stalls during festivals and in bars.

See also

 List of hors d'oeuvre
 List of sandwiches

References

External links

 Open Face Sandwiches (Obložené Chlebíčky). Slovakcooking.com.

Appetizers
Sandwiches
Czech snack foods
Slovak snack foods
Open-faced sandwiches